Beetaloo may refer to several things in Australia:
Beetaloo Station, Northern Territory
Beetaloo Sub-Basin, part of the McArthur Basin in the Northern Territory
Beetaloo Reservoir, a  water reservoir in South Australia
Beetaloo Valley, South Australia, the locality surrounding the reservoir